Sex is considered repeatedly in the Hebrew Bible. Some references provide unambiguous ethical regulations, such as the laws given in Leviticus or Deuteronomy. Others are more ambivalent, most famously the potentially homosexual actions of Ham with his father, Noah. Its depictions of homosexuality, rape, prostitution and incest have spurred considerable academic and theological attention.

Homosexuality 

The Hebrew Bible possibly refers to homosexuality three times, though the word itself does not occur in many English translations. These passages are interpreted differently. Leviticus 18:22 says:"You shall not lie with a male as with a woman. It is an abomination."Leviticus 20:13 says: "If a man lies with a male as he lies with a woman, both of them have committed an abomination. They shall surely be put to death. Their blood shall be upon them."Ham's actions in Genesis 9:20-25 possibly refer to homosexual behavior with his father Noah, while the latter was passed out drunk in his tent.

Rape 
Although the Hebrew Bible contains numerous references to rape, this was mostly unrecognized by commentators until the 20th century. It was not until the late 1970s, with the emergence of the anti-rape movement due to second-wave feminism, that feminist scholars reanalyzed Biblical scenarios in terms of sexual violence. Hebrew contains several verbs that can refer to rape, making interpretation difficult.
A commonly-cited example of Biblical rape is the Levite's concubine found in Judges.

Incest 
Lot's daughters had sex with him after they got him drunk for the purpose of becoming pregnant.

Prostitution 
Two different words for prostitute occur in the Hebrew Bible, zonah (זונה) and kedeshah (קדשה). This led to the belief that kedeshah were not ordinary prostitutes, but sacred harlots who worked in fertility temples.
 Tamar (Genesis) traded sex with her father-in-law Judah for ownership of a goat. Her motive was fulfilling what she saw as her family duty, namely producing offspring for Judah.
 Samson sees a prostitute, and visits her 
 God tells the prophet Hosea to marry Gomer ,a prostitute. 
Book of Deuteronomy 23:17–18 prohibits prostitution.

Adultery 

Exodus 20:14, as the seventh commandment, prohibits adultery. Second Samuel 11:3-5 describes King David's act of adultery with Bathsheba:

Miscellaneous 
The sin of Onan, often misinterpreted as masturbation, was coitus interruptus. Onan was also violating the duty of yibbum. He was struck down by God because he "spilt his seed upon the ground" while he had a duty to impregnate his brother's wife.
Proverbs 5 claims that sexual sin causes scars and pain.

See also 
Religious male circumcision

Notes

References
Akerly, Ben Edward, The X-Rated Bible: An Irreverent Survey of Sex in the Scriptures (American Atheist Press, 1985) 
Smith, Morton H., Shorter Catechism of the Westminster Confession Standards, (Escondido, CA: Ephesians Four Group) 1999.

Further reading

Hebrew Bible topics
Sexuality in the Bible